Alberton is a rural locality in the local government area (LGA) of Dorset in the North-east LGA region of Tasmania. The 2021 census recorded a population of 14 for Alberton.

History 
Alberton was gazetted as a locality in 1976. It is believed to have been named after Prince Albert, who visited Tasmania in the 1860s.

Geography
The Dorset River rises in the south and flows through to the north. The boundaries are a combination of ridge lines and survey lines.

Road infrastructure 
Route C423 (Mathinna Plains Road) runs along part of the western boundary. Road access is from Ringarooma via New River Road and Alberton Road.

References

Towns in Tasmania
Localities of Dorset Council (Australia)